Filipowice is a village in the administrative district of Gmina Krzeszowice, within Kraków County, Lesser Poland Voivodeship, in southern Poland.

The village has a population of 2,104. Religions: Roman Catholicism (The Church), Jehovah's Witnesses (1%).

References

Villages in Kraków County